The International Film Festival and Forum on Human Rights (FIFDH) is one of the most important international events dedicated to cinema and human rights, located in the heart of Geneva, "international capital of human rights". The inspiration and impetus behind the International Film Festival and Forum on Human Rights came from human rights defenders active in NGO's, filmmakers, media representatives and the University of Geneva.
The FIFDH coincides with the UN Human Rights Council's main session. This simultaneous event makes the Festival a Free Platform for discussion and debates on a wide variety of topics concerning human rights.
It was created by Léo Kaneman and co-founded by Yäel Reinharz Hazan, Pierre Hazan and Isabelle Gattiker in November 2002. Its first edition took place in March 2003.

Film festival 

With its concept « A film, A subject, A debate », the FIFDH aims to underline human rights violations through films and debates, in the presence of filmmakers, human rights defenders, politicians and recognized specialists. Its programme is designed to increase public awareness and inspire people to reinforce their commitment to universal values. In 2014, more than 25’000 visitors attended the Festival's screenings and debates.

An international forum on human rights 
As a genuine Forum on Human Rights, the Festival informs and firmly denounces violations of civil, political, economic, social and cultural rights wherever they occur. In the heart of Geneva, the « human rights international capital », the FIFDH is a relay for human rights defenders active on the field. It offers debates as well as unscreened films and solidarity actions.

Personalities present at the festival 
Present at the precedent editions were, among others : Edward Snowden (via Skype) Anna Politkovskaïa, Shirin Ebadi, Carla Del Ponte, Juliette Binoche, William Hurt, Viviane Reding, Taslima Nasreen, Zainab Gashaeva, Leila Shahid, Stéphane Hessel,  Julian Assange (via Skype) and his lawyer Balthasar Garzón, Joseph Stiglitz, Robert Badinter, Général Roméo Dallaire, Miguel Angel Estrella, Antonio Tabucchi, Alice Nkom, Luis Moreno-Ocampo, Edgar Morin, Rithy Panh and Abderrahmane Sissako.

Awards and jury 
The International Juries grant different Awards : the Grand Prix de Genève, the Prix de la Fondation Barbara Hendricks pour la Paix et la Réconciliation en l’honneur de Sergio Vieira de Mello, the Prix de l’Organisation Mondiale Contre la Torture (OMCT). the Prix Fiction et droits humains by the Barbour Foundation. The Eduki foundation and the PBI donate the Youth Awards

Awards 2021
 Grand Prize of Geneva: Shadow Game - Eefje Blankevoort, Els Van Driel (Netherlands)
 Gilda Vieira de Mello Prize: Downstream to Kinshasa - Dieudo Hamadi (Democratic Republic of the Congo/France/Belgium)
 Special Mention: Once Upon A Time In Venezuela - Anabel Rodríguez Ríos (Venezuela/UK/Brazil/Austria)
 Youth Jury Prize: Shadow Game - Eefje Blankevoort, Els Van Driel

Fiction Competition
 Grand Prize Fiction and Human Rights: Veins of the World - Byambasuren Davaa (Germany/Mongolia)
 Special Mention: Should the Wind Drop - Nora Martirosyan (France/Armenia/Belgium)
 Youth Jury Prize: Veins of the World - Byambasuren Davaa

Grand Reportage Competition
 Prize of OMCT: Coded Bias - Shalini Kantayya (USA/UK/China)
 Public Award: Dear Future Children - Franz Böhm (Germany/UK)
 HUG - Artopie Jury Prize: Little Girl - Sébastien Lifshitz (France/Denmark)

Awards 2016 
 Creative documentaries competition
GRAND PRIZE OF GENEVA: Among the believers by Hemal Trivedi et Mohammed Ali Naqvi

PRIZE GILDA VIEIRA DE MELLO: Hooligan sparrow by Nanfu Wang

SPECIAL JURY PRIZE, offered by the Barbara Hendricks Foundation for Peace and Reconciliation: A SYRIAN LOVE STORY by Sean McAllister

YOUTH JURY AWARD: Hooligan sparrow by Nanfu Wang
 
 Fiction and human rights competition 
GRAND PRIZE: “ZVIZDAN” (The High Sun) by Dalibor Matanić

SPECIAL MENTION: “EXPERIMENTER” by Michael Almereyda

YOUTH JURY AWARD: “3000 NIGHTS” by Mai Masri

 OMCT competition
GRAND PRIZE of the World Organization Against Torture (OMCT): “VOYAGE EN BARBARIE” by Delphine Deloget & Cécile Allegra

JURY PRIZE OF THE CENTRE DE DÉTENTION DE LA CLAIRIÈRE: “SPARTIATES” by Nicolas Wadimoff.

Awards 2015 
 Creative documentaries competition
GRAND PRIZE OF GENEVA: On the bride's side (Io sto con la sposa) by Antonio Augugliara, Gabriele del Grande and Khales Saliman Al Nassiry

PRIZE GILDA VIEIRA DE MELLO: Spartacus et Cassandra by Ioanis Nuguet, 
Special mention to The Wanted 18  by Amer Shomali and Paul Cowan

YOUTH JURY AWARD: Something better to come by Hanna Polak 
  
 Fiction and human rights competition 
GRAND PRIZE & YOUTH JURY AWARD: Charlie's Country by Rolf de Heer

 OMCT competition
GRAND PRIZE of the World Organization Against Torture (OMCT): Chechenya, a war without trace by Manon Loizeau.

Awards 2014 
 Creative documentaries competition
GRAND PRIZE OF GENEVA: Return to Homs by Talal Derki

Special mention: Sound of Torture by Keren Shayo

PRIZE GILDA VIEIRA DE MELLO: Art War by Marco Wilms

YOUTH JURY AWARD: 7 Days in Kigali by Mehdi Ba and Jeremy Frey
  
 Fiction and human rights competition 
GRAND PRIZE: A Stranger by Croatian director Bobo Jelcic

YOUTH JURY AWARD: The Selfish Giant by Clio Barnard

 OMCT competition
GRAND PRIZE of the World Organization Against Torture (OMCT): Global Gay, by Frédéric Martel  and 
Rémi Lainé

See also 
Human Rights Watch Film Festival

References

External links 
 Official website of the International Film Festival and Forum on Human Rights (FIFDH)

Human rights film festivals
Film festivals in Switzerland
Film festivals established in 2002
2002 establishments in Switzerland